Harry Welles Rusk (October 17, 1852 – January 28, 1926) was a U.S. Representative from the third district of Maryland. He was also the president of the Kennard Novelty Company in Baltimore. This was the first company to commercially sell ouija boards in 1890.

Rusk was born in Baltimore, Maryland, and attended private school for his primary education. In 1866 Rusk graduated from high school from Baltimore City College. Rusk obtained a law degree from the University of Maryland School of Law in 1872 and was admitted to the bar in 1873. Following his admission to the Maryland State Bar, Rusk began practicing law in Baltimore. Rusk served in the Maryland House of Delegates from 1876 to 1880. Subsequently, Rusk was elected and served in the Maryland State Senate from 1882 to 1884. In 1884, Rusk served as a delegate to the Democratic National Convention. Following the death of William H. Cole, Rusk was elected as a Democrat to the U.S. House of Representatives for the 49th United States Congress. Rusk served for five subsequent terms. In the 52nd Congress and 53rd Congress, Rusk was chairman of the Committee on Accounts.

After declining to run for reelection in 1896, Rusk became chairman of the Democratic State central committee for Baltimore. Rusk served in this capacity from 1898 to 1908. Thereafter, Rusk resumed practicing law in Baltimore. On January 28, 1926, Rusk died in Baltimore and was interred in Green Mount Cemetery.

Sources 
 The Official Website of William Fuld and home of the Ouija board
 Biography of Harry Welles Rusk

References

Democratic Party members of the Maryland House of Delegates
Democratic Party Maryland state senators
University of Maryland, Baltimore alumni
1852 births
1926 deaths
Baltimore City College alumni
Democratic Party members of the United States House of Representatives from Maryland